The Banjara (also known as Lambadi, Gour Rajput, Labana) are historically a Trader who may have origins in the Mewar region of what is now known as Rajasthan.

Etymology
The Banjaras usually refer to themselves as Gor and outsiders as Kor but this usage does not extend outside their own community. A related usage is Gor Mati or Gormati, meaning Own People.  Motiraj Rathod believes that the community became known as banjara from around the fourteenth century AD and but previously had some association with the Laman, who claim a 3000-year history.

Irfan Habib believes the origin of banjara to lie in the Sanskrit word variously rendered as vanij, vanik and banik, as does the name of the Bania caste, which historically was India's "pre-eminent" trading community. However, According to B. G. Halbar, the word Banjara is derived from the Sanskrit word vana chara.

Despite the community adopting a multitude of languages, Banjara is used throughout India, although in Karnataka the name is altered to Banijagaru. A survey conducted in 1968 by the All India Banjara Seva Sangh, a caste association, recorded 27 synonyms and 17 sub-groups. Recorded groups include Charan, Dharia, Mathuria,  Multani  (salt), which was a principal product that they transported across the country.

The Banjara community not having constitutional recognization as tribes community. As such the Gor Banjara is one of the historic tribes ethnically identified by isolation, their own language, culture and traditions, festivals, cuisine, dance and music. This Banjara community significantly holds such an enigmatic culture and hospitality and contrasting patriarchal and matriarchal society. It is a bramhanical and Marwadi related culture and popular community in India, which is also known by different names in various parts of the country namely, ‘Gor, Gour Banjara, Laman, Lambani, Lambadi, Gour Rajput, Nayak,  Baldiya,  and Gouriya’. They are mainly distributed in Maharastra, Karnataka, Telangana, Andhra Pradesh, Tamil Nadu, Gujarat, Madhya Pradesh, Odisha and West Bengal States and living in all the other States except the North-Eastern States and Union Territories. Gor Banjaras speak their distinct language known as ‘banjara’ which is also called as 'Gour Boli', ‘Lamani’ or ‘Lambadi’ or ‘Gormati’ or ‘Banjari’. They have their oral literature and traditions, but do not have any written literature because of not having script for their language. As their history and traditions are not in written form, it has become difficult for historians and social scientists to chronicle their past. It is said that even their subsequent history up to the Aryan migration is shrouded in obscurity, as not much was discussed about them in the books of history and culture and no significant evidences were traced about them though they are survivals from the later prehistoric period.

History
According to author J. J. Roy Burman, Banjaras have settled across Rajasthan and other parts of India. Together with the Bhopa, Domba and Kalbelia, they are sometimes called the "Gypsies of India". Professor D. B. Naik says that, "There are so many cultural similarities in the Roma Gypsies and the Banjara Lambanis".

Author  B. G. Halbar says that, Most of nomadic communities believe  that they are descended from Rajput ancestry. All these nomadic tribal groups who claim Rajput ancestry says that during the time of Mughal domination they were retreated to the forests and vowed to return only when the foreign influence had gone. However, Habib notes that their constituent groups may not in fact share a common origin, with the theories that suggest otherwise reflecting the systemic bias of nineteenth-century British ethnographers who were keen to create simple classifications. Laxman Satya notes that "Their status as Banjaras was circumscribed by the colonial state disregarding the rich diversity that existed among various groups".

Although not referred to as Banjara until the sixteenth century, Habib believes that the royal court chroniclers Ziauddin Barani and Shaikh Nasiruddin documented them operating in the Delhi Sultanate some centuries earlier, around the time of the rule of Alauddin Khalji. Halbar dates things earlier, suggesting that Dandin, a Sanskrit writer who lived in the sixth century, refers to them but, again, not by name.

Activities
Banjaras were historically pastoralists, traders, expert breeders and transporters of goods on the inland regions of India, for which they used boats, carts, camels, oxen, donkeys and sometimes the relatively scarce horse, hence controlling a large section of trade and economy. The mode of transport depended upon the terrain; for example, camels and donkeys were better suited to the highlands which carts could not negotiate, whilst oxen were able to progress better through wet lowland areas. Their prowess in negotiating thick forests was particularly prized. They often travelled in groups for protection, this tanda being led by an elected headman variously described as a muqaddam, nayak or naik. Such tandas usually comprised carriage of one specific product and thus were essentially a combined trade operation. They could be huge assemblies, some being recorded as comprising 190,000 beasts, and they also serviced the needs of armies, whose movements naturally followed the same trade and caravan routes. The Duke of Wellington used them for that purpose in his campaign against the Maratha Confederacy around the late 1790s and Jahangir, a Mughal emperor who reigned in the early seventeenth century, described them as 
Some Banjara subgroups engaged in trading specific goods but most traded in anything that might make them money - the range was vast, encompassing plains produce such as oilseed, sugarcane, opium, fruits and flowers, forest products (for example, gums, chironji, mhowa, berries, honey) and items from the hills, including tobacco and grass. Some traded in specific goods, such as the Labana subgroup (salt), the Multani (grain) and the Mukeri (wood and timber). One common Banjara practice in Berar before the British colonial period was the movement of cotton out of the region and then a return journey with groceries, salt, spices and similar consumptibles into the region. In that area, the Deccan Plateau and the Central Provinces, the Banjaras had a monopoly on the movement of salt prior to the arrival of the East India Company. More generally, they also traded in cattle, moving the beasts around the country's bazaars, and they rented out their carts.Although some older sources have suggested that they did not use credit, Habib's analysis of historic sources suggests that they did and that some were reliant on it.

The peripatetic nature of Banjara life significantly affected their societal behaviours. Satya notes that it 

Movement of goods around the country meant that the Banjaras had to be, and were, trusted by merchants, moneylenders and traders. Any disruption caused by the grazing of their livestock along the trade routes was tolerated because the same beasts provided manure to fertilise the land. However, many Europeans historically thought the Banjaras to be similar to Gypsies, although this was unjustified as there were significant differences. Habib notes that "Superstitions of all kinds, including suspected witch killings and sacrifices, reinforced the Gypsy image of the class".

In 19th century, and despite some British officials such as Thurston praising their trustworthiness as carriers, the British colonial authorities brought the community under the purview of Criminal Tribes Act of 1871. Edward Balfour noted in his On the migratory tribes of natives in Central India (1843) that the reduction in the number of wars by that time had contributed to their economic deprivation, whilst East India Company encroachment on monopolies such as salt also affected them. Many also lost their work as carriers due to the arrival of the railways and improved roads. Some tried to work the forests for wood and produce, some settled to be farmers, and others turned to crime. Earlier than this there had been British people who considered them to be undesirable because of their role in passing messages and weapons to armies as they went about their travels, and there was also a general trend among the British to treat criminality as something that was normal among communities without fixed abode. They were sometimes associated by the British with Thugee and by the 1830s had gained some notoriety for committing crimes such as roadside robbery, cattle lifting, and theft of grain or other property. The women took a leading role in such criminality, led by the headman of the gang, and if someone was convicted then the other members of the gang would take care of their families. Poor, mostly illiterate and unskilled, the Banjaras were also resistant to improvement through education, which the British felt left no recourse other than tight control through policing. Their reputation for misdeeds persisted into the early twentieth century.

The status of the Banjaras as a designated criminal tribe continued until after the independence of India, when the repeal of the Criminal Tribes Act caused them to be classified as one of the Denotified Tribes.

Culture 
Gour Banjaras have a unique cultural life and practices that differentiate them from others. They also have their own language, food habits, body tattooing, dress and ornaments, art , Martial art, Gourilla fighting skill, 'Ghumar' dance and festivals and ceremonies, which have formed their culture. Gor Banjara culture includes their language, costume, marriage customs, festivities, folk and performing arts and many other capabilities acquired by them. Their culture with its language and professions seems distinct and different from other tribes. Gour Banjara culture is known as Rajputana culture. They have their own language called ‘Banjara’,' Brinjari' or ‘Gormati’ and a different and distinct culture of their own.

Some of the southern Indian Banjaras practise a tradition of celebrating a special pooja called "Ghar Ghar Bhavanir Pooja" in which Gour Banjaras worship Jagdamba, Tulja Bhavani , Hinglaj goddess and Cheetala Yaadi Goddess and perform animal sacrifice and worship the gods whole night and invite all the relatives for the feast

There are many gotras in Gaur Banjara such as Ransoth,  Meghavat, Ramawat, Zarapala , Jhala, Khetavat, Maloth, Nunavat,   Munavat, Shekhavath, Gughloth, Goramo, Wakdoth, Isalavath.  Rathod, Chavan, Pawar and Jadhav are the main four clans in Gour Banjaras.  Banjara culture is well known as an independent and unique culture. 

.

Language
Banjaras speak Gour Boli; also called Banjara, Banjary it belongs to the Indo-Aryan group of languages. As Banjara, Lambadi has no script, it is either written in Devanagari script or in the script of the local language such as Telugu or Kannada. Many Banjaras today are bilingual or multilingual, adopting the predominant language of their surroundings, but those that continue to live in areas of dense Banjara population persist with their traditional language.

" Kesula Nai  Mora ri, Maayad Bhasha Banjara ri. Chanda Suryasyu Amraa ri, Jeeve Jeevesyu Pyari."  (Banjara is my mother tongue. Blooming like a flowers. She is immortal like the Moon and the Sun. She is dearer to us than life.) This is considered the pride song of Banjara language. This popular composition of  Eknath Pawar- Nayak (Maharashtra)an expert in Banjara language, literature and culture. many MPs have also demanded in Parliament the status of Banjara language. MP Umesh Jadhav, MP Suresh Dhanorkar, former MP Harisingh Rathour, Rajeev Satav, etc. demanded in Parliament to include Banjara language in the Eighth Schedule of the Constitution. Telangana state has introduced two textbooks in Banjara language for primary school children in 1,426 Tanda's in the State. 
Gour Banjaras have their own mother tongue called ‘Gorboli’, Banjary and it is spoken by people living across India. According to their names their language is also known by various names such as Lamani, Lambadi, Lambani, Brinjari, Gourmati, Banjara, Lubhani and variants. Regional dialects are divided between the Banjaras of MH (written in Marathi and Hindi by using Devanagari script), KK (written in the Kannada script), AP and TS (written in the Telugu script). They are bilingual and speak in Hindi or Marathi or Kannada or Telugu along with their mother tongue ‘Gorboli’, but there is an influence of regional languages on their ‘Banjaras’ language. As such the actual number of ‘Gorboli Banjara’ speakers is not known since the census is not being enumerated based on language for the last many years. 

The state wise census of Banjaras is also not available as they were listed under different categories in various states of India, though they are living across India. However, based on the unofficial sources, they have an estimated population of more than (4) Crore. ‘Gorboli’ has no script, but they have abundant oral literature, which is also not recorded much, and they are left with no written literature for the last many centuries. However, Banjaras are upkeeping their language and oral traditions by transferring them orally from one generation to next generation. On the other hand, their language and literature are in the danger of depletion due to modernization and influence of outer societies around them. Therefore, there is an urgent need to study the status of Banjaras ‘Banjara’ language and explore the possibilities of adopting a script and protecting the linguistic identity of Banjaras.

Administration
The place where the people of Banjara community live is called "Tanda". According to Eknath Pawar Nayak (Maharashtra), a well-known litterateur and expert on the Tanda system, "Tanda is a colony of the Banjara community that preserves the heritage of its historical and independent culture."  Tanda is a group of Banjara speakers. Whose population ranges from 100 to 3-4 thousand. The headman of Tanda is called 'Nayak' in Hindi and 'Naik' in Marathi language. He is accompanied by prominent dignitaries such as Karbhari, Hasabi, Nasaabi and Dysan. Everyone has different roles, but is led by Naik/Nayak. Vasantrao Naik, the great social reformer and father of the Green Revolution, provided stability to Tanda. The great warrior and knight who built the world's largest "Lohgarh" fort, 'Banjara King' Lakhishah Banjara, known as Asia's biggest civil merchant, is still mentioned all over the world. Shah means 'king'. His Raisina and Maalchi Tanda were situated in Delhi. Today, even though the city is known as a village, its true identity in the Banjara culture is 'Tanda'. Known by the name of (like Gahuli Tanda, Kuntur Tanda, Barad Tanda, Varoli Tanda, Rui Tanda, Mandvi Tanda etc.) But in past it was known as Nayak. (Like Bhimasingh Naikker Tando, Fulsing Bapur Tando, Ramji Naikker Tando ie Bhimasingh Nayak's Tanda, Fulsing Bapu's Tanda). Tanda is considered as the fort of Banjara. Tanda is also known as 'Garh'. (like Gahuligarh, Gadmangrul, Sevagarh, Umrigarh, Ruigarh, Lakhagarh, Pohragarh, Mandvigarh, Varoligarh, Sudhagarh.)

Art 

Banjara art includes performance arts such as dance and music as well as folk and plastic arts such as rangoli, textile embroidery, tattooing and painting. Banjara embroidery and tattooing are especially prized and also form a significant aspect of the Banjara identity. Lambani women specialise in lepo embroidery, which involves stitching pieces of mirror, decorative beads and coins onto clothes. Sandur Lambani embroidery is a type of textile embroidery unique to the tribe in Sanduru, Bellary district, Karnataka. It has obtained a GI tag.

Festivals 
Banjara people celebrate the festival of Teej during Shravana (the month of August). In this festival young unmarried Banjara girls pray for a good groom. They sow seeds in bamboo bowls and water it three times a day for nine days and if the sprouts grow "thick and high" it is considered a good omen. During Teej the seedling-baskets are kept in the middle and girls sing and dance around them.

Dance and music 
Fire dance, 'Ghumar' dance and Chari dance are the traditional dance forms of the Banjaras. Banjaras have a sister community of singers known as Dadhis or Gajugonia. They are traditionally travelled from village to village singing songs to the accompaniment of sarangi.

Religion 
All of the Banjara people profess faith in Hinduism and follow Hindu culture. They are known to worship deities such as Balaji, Goddess Jagadamba Devi, Goddess Bhavani, Renuka Mata of Mahur and Hanuman. They also hold Guru Nanak in great respect. However, the Banjaras have been "ambiguous" with regard to religion and were "tolerant and syncretic", according to Satya. He notes, like Habib, that some banjaras those who had settled in the Wun district of Berar must have annoyed local Brahmins by preferring to use the services of their own priests rather than of that priestly caste. Further, they were associated with the Mahanubhava sect which led to a belief in Krishna and "a casual attitude towards cohabitation".

Sevalal or Sevabhaya is the most important saint of the Banjaras. According to their accounts, he was born on 15 February 1739 and died on 4 December 1806. A cattle merchant by profession he is said to have been a man of exemplary truthfulness, a great musician, a courageous warrior, a rationalist who fought against superstition and a devotee of the goddess Jagadamba. The colonial British administrators also quote his stories but they place him in the 19th century and identify his original name as Siva Rathor.

Society 
Although the Banjaras were traditionally a migratory people, they did historically mostly settle each year in fixed village accommodation during the monsoon months of June - August and their elderly people are usually permanently  Although the introduction of modern modes of transport largely made the community redundant from their traditional occupation, forcing them into economic distress from which they sought relief by turning to agriculture and other unskilled labour, V. Sarveswara Naik notes that as recently as 1996 many still retain a nomadic lifestyle on a seasonal basis to supplement their income. They also retain common traits among their exogamous clans, including strict tribal endogamy, use of the Gor-Boli language, referencing themselves as Gor, settling in tanda groups, using tribal councils called Gor panchayats to resolve disputes and, in the case of the women, dressing in their traditional clothing. However, the men have largely given up their traditional attire of a white dhoti (shirt) and a red turban, along with the wearing of ear-rings, finger rings and kanadoro (silver strings worn around the waist).

Marriage 
Aside from retaining their practice of endogamy, V. Sarveswara Naik records of Banjara customs in 1990s Andhra Pradesh that they follow forms of marriage that include monogamy, serial monogamy.  widows are allowed to remarry and divorce is accepted provided it has the consent of the Gor panchayat. The marriages are usually between people who live fairly close together, within the same taluka  or, occasionally, district; the exception to this is the relatively rare case when the man has some education, in which case it is becoming more common to see them making arrangements that involve a longer distance.

It is the boys' fathers who initiate marriage proposals, usually when the child reaches the age of 18 and is considered capable of running an independent household. Women and girls, including the prospective bride, have no say in the matter but he father takes advice from the naik of his tanda and from close relatives. The girls are usually prepared for this arranged marriage from the onset of puberty and her parents will make a show of resistance when a proposal is made before her father agrees to the advice given by his Naik and village elders. Horoscopes are consulted and information gleaned regarding the boy's prospects. Sometimes the arrangement is made earlier and may even be solemnised with a betrothal ceremony, called a sagai, but the girl will remain in the household until she does attain puberty. When agreement is reached and both sides make a promise to that effect in front of the Gor panchayat, the boy's family distribute liquor, betel leaves and nuts nuts for the tanda and girl's family. She is presented with a full set of traditional dress upon marriage, which is made by her mother. Women's dress varies according to marital status, as does their ornamentation. Although the ornamentation was once made of ivory and silver, reduced economic circumstances have caused it to become plastic and aluminium. The extremely elaborate nature of their dresses, comprising glass pieces, beads and sea-shells on a mainly red material, means that they are worn for months between careful launderings.

The practice of paying a bride price to the girl's father traditionally applies on betrothal, which is a community celebration, although the payment of a dowry by the bride's family is becoming evident. The value of this transaction is set by the Gor panchayat and is now a monetary figure; it was traditionally eleven rupees and either four bullocks or one bullock and three cattle unless the groom's family was particularly wealthy. The theory was that this payment compensated the bride's family for their loss of her domestic services, although the money was then spent by them on the marriage ceremonies and one of the animals was decorated and given to the bride after the marriage.

The marriage is usually arranged for a time when there is little work, so the months of April and May are common as they fall just after the harvest period. It is an elaborate ritual that takes place over several days and differs somewhat from a Hindu ceremony.

Gender roles 
Banjara families prefer to have both sons and daughters. The son is considered necessary because they are a patrilineal society, whilst at least one daughter is deemed desirable because she can look after the parents in their old age if the son is too pre-occupied in his marriage. Daughters also contribute greatly to the running of the family unit prior to their own marriage and are prized by their mothers for that reason, being trained in various domestic tasks that benefit both the unit and their future married life. Aside from strictly domestic tasks, they are an economic boon because they help with herding and grazing the family's cattle and with work in the crop fields.

A Banjara wife is subservient to her husband and is expected to perform daily tasks for her parents-in-law. Whilst she and her husband live with her parents-in-law, she is also subservient to her mother-in-law. This period of co-habitation with the extended family usually lasts until the husband has helped to arrange the marriages of his brothers and is often the cause of arguments between the wife, the mother-in-law and any sisters-in-law. Once the husband is free of his obligation to his brothers, his wife will apply pressure to achieve a separation from the joint household, which grants her a measure of independence although she remains economically reliant upon her husband. The separating of the households causes her husband to receive some property from his parents, such as land, livestock and money, but it is a patrilineal society and so the wife has nothing.

Banjara men take the lead in religious festivals, with women playing a subsidiary role. The men sing the devotional songs and perform the temple rituals but it is the women who do most of the singing and dancing. The women are also expected to work with men when groups go to enact performances in front of non-Banjara audiences to raise money for the celebration of festivals, but most of that money is then consumed by the men in the form of liquor. The one religious function in which the women are paramount is the preparations for marriage, a ceremony which usually takes place in the house of the bride's family.

It is the men who also perform political functions, settling disputes and dealing with other problems through the Gor panchayat. Any matter that involves a woman is dealt with by the men and it is a man who represents her interests, an example being the dealings for marriage proposals which always require the consent of the Gor panchayat. If a woman leaves her husband and the marital abode then that, too, is a matter to be judged by the men.

finds herself displaced from the Banjara tanda community, having to live instead in a multi-caste area, perhaps learn a new language and abandon the customs with which she is familiar, including her traditional dress. It is in this circumstance, where the husband has some education, that the trend is to favour the dowry system over that of bride price involving cattle.

V. Sarveswara Naik, herself a Banjara, notes of the situation for Banjara women in Andhra Pradesh that

Discrimination 
Banjara women can face discrimination when away from their tanda. Their relative innocence, linguistic barriers to communication and traditional dress all attract attention and ill-treatment. Majority of Banjara Men and Women have changed their traditional dresses to avoid discrimination and also due to globalization.

Distribution 
As of 2008, the Banjara community has been listed as a Scheduled Tribe in the states of Andhra Pradesh, Telangana and Odisha. They were designated as an Other Backward Class in Chhattisgarh, Gujarat, Haryana, Madhya Pradesh, Maharashtra and Rajasthan, and as a Scheduled Caste in Karnataka, Delhi and Punjab( SC for Bazigar, Badi and Banjara and OBC for Lambana, Labana, Lambani, Vanzara and Lohana).

See also 
 List of Scheduled Tribes in India

References 
Notes

Citations

Bibliography

Further reading

External links 

 
Other Backward Classes of Chhattisgarh
Other Backward Classes of Gujarat
Other Backward Classes of Haryana
Other Backward Classes of Madhya Pradesh
Other Backward Classes of Maharashtra
Other Backward Classes of Rajasthan
Scheduled Castes of Karnataka
Scheduled Castes of Delhi
Scheduled Castes of Punjab
Scheduled Tribes of Andhra Pradesh
Scheduled Tribes of Odisha
Denotified tribes of India
Scheduled Tribes of Telangana
Hindu communities
Hindu ethnic groups
Social groups of Rajasthan